Middle Township is a township in Cape May County, in the U.S. state of New Jersey. It is part of the Ocean City metropolitan statistical area and of South Jersey. As of the 2020 United States census, the township's population was 20,380, an increase of 1,469 (+7.8%) from the 2010 census count of 18,911, which in turn reflected an increase of 2,506 (+15.3%) from the 16,405 counted in the 2000 census. The township's Cape May Court House section is the county seat of Cape May County.

History 
Middle Township was formed as a precinct on April 2, 1723, and was incorporated by Township Act of 1798 of the New Jersey Legislature on February 21, 1798 as one of New Jersey's initial group of 104 townships. Portions of the township have been taken to form Anglesea Borough (on June 13, 1885; now North Wildwood), Avalon (April 18, 1892), Wildwood (May 1, 1895), Stone Harbor (April 3, 1914) and West Wildwood (April 21, 1920). The township's name came from its location when Cape May was split into three townships in 1723 at the same time that Lower Township and Upper Township were created.

Geography
According to the U.S. Census Bureau, the township had a total area of 82.92 square miles (214.77 km2), including 70.24 square miles (181.92 km2) of land and 12.69 square miles (32.86 km2) of water (15.30%).

Burleigh (with a 2010 Census population of 725), Cape May Court House (5,338), Rio Grande (2,670) and Whitesboro (2,205) are unincorporated communities and census-designated places (CDPs) located within Middle Township; Whitesboro and Burleigh had previously been combined for statistical purposes by the Census Bureau as Whitesboro-Burleigh through the 2000 Census. Other unincorporated communities, localities and place names located partially or completely within the township include Del Haven, Dias Creek, Goshen, Goshen Landing, Green Creek, Holly Beach, Mayville, Norburys Landing, Nummytown, Pierces, Pierces Point, Reeds Beach, Shellbed Landing, Swain Point, Swainton, Wildwood Gardens and Wildwood Junction.

The township borders the Cape May County municipalities of Avalon Borough, Dennis Township, Lower Township, North Wildwood City, Sea Isle City, Stone Harbor Borough, Wildwood City and West Wildwood Borough, along with the Atlantic Ocean and Delaware Bay.

Demographics

2010 census

The Census Bureau's 2006–2010 American Community Survey showed that (in 2010 inflation-adjusted dollars) median household income was $57,244 (with a margin of error of +/− $6,225) and the median family income was $66,451 (+/− $6,897). Males had a median income of $49,645 (+/− $5,272) versus $48,029 (+/− $5,201) for females. The per capita income for the township was $28,087 (+/− $1,866). About 4.4% of families and 6.2% of the population were below the poverty line, including 6.4% of those under age 18 and 5.6% of those age 65 or over.

2000 census
As of the 2000 census, there were 16,405 people, 6,009 households, and 4,218 families residing in the township. The racial makeup of the township was 85.21% White, 10.86% African American, 0.23% Native American, 1.44% Asian, 0.02% Pacific Islander, 0.66% from other races, and 1.58% from two or more races. Hispanic or Latino of any race were 2.12% of the population.

There were 6,009 households, out of which 31.5% had children under the age of 18 living with them, 53.9% were married couples living together, 12.0% had a female householder with no husband present, and 29.8% were non-families. 24.6% of all households were made up of individuals, and 11.9% had someone living alone who was 65 years of age or older. The average household size was 2.58 and the average family size was 3.08.

In the township, the population was spread out, with 24.7% under the age of 18, 6.5% from 18 to 24, 27.8% from 25 to 44, 23.2% from 45 to 64, and 17.8% who were 65 years of age or older. The median age was 40 years. For every 100 females, there were 93.1 males.  For every 100 females age 18 and over, there were 88.5 males.

The median income for a household in the township was $41,533, and the median income for a family was $49,030. Males had a median income of $37,531 versus $27,166 for females. The per capita income for the township was $19,805.  About 8.6% of families and 10.2% of the population were below the poverty line, including 14.5% of those under age 18 and 10.6% of those age 65 or over.

Government

Local government 
Middle Township is governed under the Township form of government, one of 141 municipalities (of the 564) statewide that use this form, the second-most commonly used form of government in the state. The governing body is comprised of a three-member Township Committee, whose members are elected directly by the voters at-large in partisan elections to serve three-year terms of office on a staggered basis, with one seat coming up for election each year as part of the November general election in a three-year cycle. At an annual reorganization meeting, the Township Committee selects one of its members to serve as Mayor and another as Deputy Mayor.

, the Township Committee consists of Mayor Timothy C. Donohue (R, term on committee ends December 31, 2023; term as mayor ends 2022), Deputy Mayor Theron "Ike" Gandy (R, term on committee ends 2024; term as deputy mayor ends 2024) and James Norris (R, 2022).

Federal, state, and county representation 
Middle Township is located in the 2nd Congressional District and is part of New Jersey's 1st state legislative district.

Politics
As of March 2011, there were a total of 12,114 registered voters in Middle Township, of which 3,041 (25.1%) were registered as Democrats, 3,823 (31.6%) were registered as Republicans and 5,244 (43.3%) were registered as Unaffiliated. There were 6 voters registered as Libertarians or Greens.

In the 2012 presidential election, Republican Mitt Romney received 49.6% of the vote (4,328 cast), ahead of Democrat Barack Obama with 49.3% (4,299 votes), and other candidates with 1.1% (93 votes), among the 8,796 ballots cast by the township's 12,717 registered voters (76 ballots were spoiled), for a turnout of 69.2%. In the 2008 presidential election, Republican John McCain received 49.5% of the vote (4,483 cast), ahead of Democrat Barack Obama, who received 48.4% (4,389 votes), with 9,059 ballots cast among the township's 11,493 registered voters, for a turnout of 78.8%. In the 2004 presidential election, Republican George W. Bush received 54.0% of the vote (4,391 ballots cast), outpolling Democrat John Kerry, who received around 44.1% (3,586 votes), with 8,133 ballots cast among the township's 10,977 registered voters, for a turnout percentage of 74.1.

In the 2013 gubernatorial election, Republican Chris Christie received 67.5% of the vote (3,856 cast), ahead of Democrat Barbara Buono with 30.8% (1,757 votes), and other candidates with 1.7% (98 votes), among the 5,911 ballots cast by the township's 12,651 registered voters (200 ballots were spoiled), for a turnout of 46.7%. In the 2009 gubernatorial election, Republican Chris Christie received 48.4% of the vote (3,024 ballots cast), ahead of both Democrat Jon Corzine with 41.5% (2,593 votes) and Independent Chris Daggett with 6.1% (381 votes), with 6,244 ballots cast among the township's 12,320 registered voters, yielding a 50.7% turnout.

Education

The Middle Township Public Schools serve students in kindergarten through twelfth grade. As of the 2018–19 school year, the district, comprised of four schools, had an enrollment of 2,608 students and 208.0 classroom teachers (on an FTE basis), for a student–teacher ratio of 12.5:1. Schools in the district (with 2018–19 enrollment data from the National Center for Education Statistics) are 
Middle Township Elementary School #1 with 670 students in grades Pre-K–2, 
Middle Township Elementary School #2 with 563 students in grades 3–5, 
Middle Township Middle School with 533 students in grades 6–8 and 
Middle Township High School with 767 students in grades 9–12. Students from Avalon, Dennis Township, Stone Harbor and Woodbine attend the district's high school as part of sending/receiving relationships.

Students are also eligible to attend Cape May County Technical High School in Cape May Court House, which serves students from the entire county in its comprehensive and vocational programs, which are offered without charge to students who are county residents. Special needs students may be referred to Cape May County Special Services School District in Cape May Court House.

There is a private Christian K–12 school in Middle Township, Cape Christian Academy. It is in the CMCH CDP and has a CMCH postal address. Richard Degener of the Press of Atlantic City described it as being in Burleigh.

The Roman Catholic Diocese of Camden operates Bishop McHugh Regional School, a Catholic K–8 school, in Ocean View, Dennis Township, which has a Cape May Courthouse postal address. It is supported by four parishes in Cape May County including the Cape May Courthouse Church. The sole Catholic high school program in Cape May County is in Wildwood Catholic Academy (K–12) in North Wildwood, which also operates under the Camden Diocese.

Cape May County Library has its Cape May Court House branch.

Infrastructure

Transportation

Roads and highways

U.S. Route 9, Route 47 and Route 147 are other significant roadways within Middle Township.

Public transportation
NJ Transit offers bus service between Cape May and Philadelphia on the 313, 315 and 316 (seasonal only) routes, between Cape May and the Port Authority Bus Terminal in Midtown Manhattan on the 319, between Rio Grande and Wildwood on the 510 (seasonal only), and between Cape May and Atlantic City on the 552 route.

The Great American Trolley Company operates trolley service from North Wildwood and Wildwood to shopping centers in Rio Grande on Mondays through Fridays in the summer months.

Health care
Cape Regional Medical Center, located in Cape May Court House, is the only hospital in Cape May County. It was known as Burdette Tomlin Memorial Hospital until April 2007. In May 2021, The Claire C. Brodesser Surgery Center opened to patients needing ambulatory surgery and endoscopy services.

Wineries
 Jessie Creek Winery
 Natali Vineyards

Notable people

People who were born in, residents of, or otherwise closely associated with Middle Township include:
 Bob Andrzejczak (born 1986), politician who represented the 1st Legislative District in the New Jersey General Assembly from 2013 to 2019 and in the New Jersey Senate in 2019
 Kevin Bramble (born 1972), disabled ski racer, freeskier, and mono-ski designer and builder
 Anthony J. Cafiero (1900–1982), politician who served as a member of the New Jersey Senate from 1949 to 1953 and as a judge in New Jersey Superior Court
 Maurice Catarcio (1929–2005), professional wrestler for the World Wrestling Federation and record holder in The Guinness Book of World Records
 Daniel Cohen (1936–2018), children's writer
 Joe Fala (born 1997), soccer player who plays as a defender for New York Red Bulls II in the USL Championship
 Stedman Graham (born 1951), educator, author, businessman and speaker, best known as the partner of media mogul Oprah Winfrey
 LaMarr Greer (born 1976), retired basketball player who played in the United States Basketball League and the International Basketball League
 Matthew Maher (born 1984), retired soccer defender, who was sentenced to five and a half years in prison for first degree aggravated manslaughter and drunken driving
 Matthew Szczur (born 1989), centerfielder for the Chicago Cubs
 Julius H. Taylor (1914–2011), professor emeritus at Morgan State University who was chairperson of the department of physics.
 Andrew J. Tomlin (1845–1906), awarded the Medal of Honor for his actions in the Civil War

References

External links

Middle Township website

 
1723 establishments in New Jersey
Populated places established in 1723
Township form of New Jersey government
Townships in Cape May County, New Jersey